Chi or CHI may refer to:

Greek
Chi (letter), the Greek letter (uppercase Χ, lowercase χ);

Chinese
Chi (length) (尺), a traditional unit of length, about ⅓  meter
Chi (mythology) (螭), a dragon
Chi (surname) (池, pinyin: chí)
Ch'i or qi (氣), "energy force"
Chinese language (ISO 639-2 code "chi")
Ji (surname), various surnames written Chi in Wade–Giles

Arts and entertainment
Chi (2013 film), a Canadian documentary
Chi (2019 film), a Burmese drama
Chi: On the Movements of the Earth, a manga series by Uoto
The Chi, an American drama series created by Lena Waithe for Showtime
Chi (Chobits), a character in Chobits media
Sailor Chi, a villain in the Sailor Moon manga
Chi, a character in Chi's Sweet Home media
"Chi", a song by Korn from Life Is Peachy

Science and mathematics
Chi, the hyperbolic cosine integral
A symbol for electronegativity

People
Chi Cheng (musician) (1970–2013), American musician
Chi McBride (born 1961), American actor
Chi Onwurah (born 1965), British politician

Other uses
Chi (kana), (hiragana ち, katakana チ)
 Chi, a person's guardian spirit in the Odinani beliefs of the Igbo people of Nigeria
Chi River, Thailand
an abbreviation for Chichester, England
Chi (magazine), an Italian magazine
Chi (instrument) a Chinese flute
Chingford railway station, railway station code

See also
Chi-Chi (disambiguation)
Chi distribution, in statistics
Chi site, a DNA sequence that serves as a recombination hot spot
CHI (disambiguation), as an initialism or acronym
Chicago, known as Chi-Town
Qi (disambiguation)